Leonard Chadwick (November 24, 1878 – May 18, 1940) was a Spanish–American War Medal of Honor recipient who served in the United States Navy as an Apprentice 1st Class aboard the .

Biography
Chadwick was born in Middletown, Delaware and enlisted in the U.S. Navy in Philadelphia on October 26, 1895, serving aboard the USS Richmond, Vermont, Constellation, Alliance, Puritan, Brooklyn, Texas and Marblehead.

Chadwick was one of fifty-two men to receive the Medal of Honor for an operation involving locating and cutting oceanic cables to block communication from a cable house off the shore of Cientuegos, Cuba. He received his medal on July 7, 1899. Leonard McKuiry Chadwick was born at Middletown, Delaware, USA, on Nov 24, 1878. He joined the US Navy and served as an Apprentice, First Class. During the Spanish/American War on May 11,1898, he was with a boat Party attempting to cut a chain in Santiago Harbour under a heavy fire. His courage earned him the Congressional Medal of Honour, the US equivalent of the Victoria Cross (VC).

Medal of Honor Citation: "On board the USS Marblehead during the operation of cutting the cable leading from Cienfuegos, Cuba, 11 May 1898. Facing the heavy fire of the enemy, Chadwick set an example of extraordinary bravery and coolness throughout this period."

Leonard Chadwick apparently brought mules to South Africa, then decided to join up. A 1902 magazine refers to "a brave American trooper of Roberts Horse who galloped out to save wounded men at Koorn Spruit under heavy fire, and who was later prominent, still under fire, in helping to save the guns." As reported in 'Black and White Budget' (page 750): "Lord Roberts has confirmed the award of the Queen's Scarf to Trooper Chadwick, of Roberts' Horse, whom his fellow troopers chose as the most distinguished of his corps for bravery. Trooper Chadwick proves to be an American, who was one of the boat's crew who cut the cable across Santiago Harbour during the Spanish American War... South Africa's scarf has, therefore, gone to America."

In the SA Field Force Casualty List, No 2.479 Private L Chadwick is shown as having been taken prisoner by the Boers, together with Privates W Benson and G Redpath. They were captured at Rhenoster on July 28, 1900, and released shortly afterwards.

General De Wet was at Rhenosterpoort, near Schoeman's Drift on the Vaal River. He created a diversion by sending Captain Danie Theron to Rhenoster Kop, 12 miles to the south. On July 28 Theron attacked America Siding unsuccessfully. Presumably he succeeded in taking three unwanted prisoners! [The Times History, Vol IV p 420-1 ]
Trooper Chadwick proved to be the most decorated of all the Queen's Scarf awardees, for he held the American Congressional Medal of Honour and was awarded the DCM for the Anglo-Boer War. Lord Roberts recommendations for meritorious service of April 2,1901, refers to J [sic] McKuiry Chadwick, while the DCM award is to J McKinry Chadwick.

Chadwick was next heard of in 1920 at a boarding house in Boston, where he awaited his niece's graduation as a nurse, then accompanied her to Nova Scotia. She later married a Dr Fowler. It is assumed that Chadwick died before 1940

After his discharge, Chadwick moved to Boston, Massachusetts where he sold insurance and worked in the Morocco leather industry. A 1923 accident left him with a dislocated elbow and knee and he was declared totally disabled in 1937. Chadwick died at his home of asphyxiation and alcoholism on May 18, 1940, and was interred in Mount Hope Cemetery, West Roxbury, Massachusetts.

Chadwick has also been credited with inventing the cocktail, Long Island Iced Tea, although this is not confirmed.

Military awards
United States
Medal of Honor
Sampson Medal
Spanish Campaign Medal

United Kingdom
Distinguished Conduct Medal
Queen's South Africa Medal

Medal of Honor citation

Citation:
On board the USS Marblehead during the operation of cutting the cable leading from Cientuegos, Cuba, May 11, 1898. Facing the heavy fire of the enemy, Chadwick set an example of extraordinary bravery and coolness throughout this period.

See also

 List of Medal of Honor recipients
 List of Medal of Honor recipients for the Spanish–American War

External links
 

1878 births
1940 deaths
United States Navy Medal of Honor recipients
People from Middletown, Delaware
American military personnel of the Spanish–American War
Alcohol-related deaths in Massachusetts
Spanish–American War recipients of the Medal of Honor
Deaths from asphyxiation